Singapore Tamils who majorly came from the South Indian state of Tamil Nadu and the union territory Puducherry and some people are also from Sri Lanka. Singapore has emerged as the most preferred destination among migrants from Tamil Nadu. A study has revealed that 410,000 of the 2.2 million Tamil Nadu diaspora were residing in Singapore in 2015.

Status

Tamil is one of the four official languages of Singapore. Tamil is taught as a second language in most government schools from primary to junior college levels. Tamil is an examinable subject at all major nationwide exams. There is a daily Tamil newspaper printed in Singapore, Tamil Murasu. There is a full-time radio station, Oli 96.8FM, and a full-fledged television channel, Vasantham.

Little India

Little India, Singapore is an ethnic place of Indians located in the east of Singapore and mostly follows the Tamil cultural heritage system.

See also
Indian Singaporeans
Tamil diaspora

References

Ethnic groups in Singapore